Laci J. Mailey (born 15 November 1990) is a Canadian actress known mostly for her work on television.  She first became known for her recurring role on Falling Skies. She had a recurring role in the second season of the CBC Television series The Romeo Section and currently appears as Jess O'Brien in the Hallmark Channel family drama Chesapeake Shores.

Personal
Laci Mailey grew up in British Columbia as the baby of her family. She attended Vancouver Film School straight out of high school, and has also studied in New York City and Los Angeles.

Filmography
Below is a selected filmography for Laci J. Mailey, sometimes credited as just Laci Mailey.

References

External links

1990 births
Actresses from British Columbia
Canadian film actresses
Canadian television actresses
Living people
Vancouver Film School alumni